The Digital Humanities conference is an academic conference for the field of digital humanities. It is hosted by Alliance of Digital Humanities Organizations and has been held annually since 1989.

History
The first joint conference was held in 1989, at the University of Toronto—but that was the 16th annual meeting of ALLC, and the ninth annual meeting of the ACH-sponsored International Conference on Computers and the Humanities (ICCH).

The Chronicle of Higher Education has called the conference "highly competitive" but "worth the price of admission," praising its participants' focus on best practices, the intellectual community it has fostered, and the tendency of its organizers to sponsor attendance of early-career scholars (important given the relative expense of attending it, as compared to other academic conferences).

An analysis of the Digital Humanities conference abstracts between 2004 and 2014 highlights some trends evident in the evolution of the conference (such as the increasing rate of new authors entering the field, and the continuing disproportional predominance of authors from North America represented in the abstracts). An extended study (2000-2015) offer a feminist and critical engagement of Digital Humanities conferences with solutions for a more inclusive culture. Scott Weingart has also published detailed analyses of submissions to Digital Humanities 2013, 2014, 2015, and 2016 on his blog.

Conferences

References

External links
 Alliance of Digital Humanities Organizations official website

Humanities conferences
Digital humanities
Computer science conferences